Sven Knipphals (born 20 September 1985 in Hannover) is a German athlete specialising in the sprinting events. He finished fourth in the 4 × 100 metres relay at the 2013 World Championships. In addition, he won the silver medal in the same event at the 2014 European Championships.

His father, Jens Knipphals, is a former long jumper.

Competition record

Personal bests
Outdoor
100 metres – 10.13 (+1.9 m/s) (Regensburg 2015)
200 metres – 20.48 (+1.7 m/s) (Mannheim 2014)
Indoor
200 metres – 21.02 (Karlsruhe 2012)

References

1985 births
Living people
Sportspeople from Hanover
German male sprinters
European Athletics Championships medalists
World Athletics Championships athletes for Germany
Olympic athletes of Germany
Athletes (track and field) at the 2016 Summer Olympics